Locked Inside A Dream is Alyssa Milano's third studio album, released on May 21, 1991. The CD comes with a 24-page booklet of photographs packaged in a cardboard slipcase. The CD single for "New Sensation" includes a television mix version of the song, which is a karaoke version with background vocals. The second single "No Secret" was released exclusively in France in 1993, two years after the album's official release. The B-Side was the album track "Your Lips Don't Lie".

The album peaked at number 19 on the Japanese Oricon Albums Chart for a total of five weeks.

In 1993, the album was released in France via Remark Records, where the title was changed to Alyssa Milano.

Track listing

Singles

Chart performance

References

Alyssa Milano albums
1991 albums
Pony Canyon albums